Hysterical Stars is the second album by Chicago-based band Head of Femur. It was released on May 25, 2005, on Spin Art Records.

Track listing
 "Elliott Gould Is in California Split"
 "Ringodom or Proctor"
 "Manhattan"
 "Percy"
 "Skirts are Takin' Over"
 "The Sausage Canoe"
 "Oh You're Blue"
 "Song for Richard Manuel"
 "Born in the Seventies"
 "Easy Street"
 "Sometimes Friends"
 "Jack and the Water Buffalo"

References

External links
Head of Femur official website
spinART records

Head of Femur (band) albums
2005 albums